In variational Bayesian methods, the evidence lower bound (often abbreviated ELBO, also sometimes called the variational lower bound or negative variational free energy) is a useful lower bound on the log-likelihood of some observed data.

Terminology and notation 

Let  and  be random variables, jointly-distributed with distribution . We refer to the above inequality as the ELBO inequality.

In the terminology of variational Bayesian methods, the distribution  is called the evidence. Some authors use the term evidence to mean , and others authors call  the log-evidence, and some use the terms evidence and log-evidence interchangeably.

There is no generally fixed notation for the ELBO. In this article we use

Motivation

Variational Bayesian inference 
Suppose we have an observable random variable , and we want to find its true distribution . This would allow us to generate data by sampling, and estimate probabilities of future events. In general, it is impossible to find  exactly, forcing us to search for a good approximation.

This is a problem in the calculus of variations, thus it is called the variational method.

Since there are not many explicitly parametrized distribution families (all the classical distribution families, such as the normal distribution, the Gumbel distribution, etc, are far too simplistic to model the true distribution), we consider implicitly parametrized probability distributions:

 First, define a simple distribution  over a latent random variable . Usually a normal distribution or a uniform distribution suffices.
 Finally, define a way to convert any  into a simple distribution over the observable random variable .

It is very easy to sample : simply sample , then compute , and finally sample  using .

In other words, we have a generative model for both the observable and the latent.
In general, it's impossible to perform the integral , forcing us to perform another approximation.

So define another distribution family  and use it to approximate . This is a discriminative model for the latent.

The entire situation is summarized in the following table:

The usual Bayesian method is to estimate the integral , then compute by Bayes rule . This is expensive to perform in general, but if we can simply find a good approximation  for most , then we can infer  from  cheaply. Thus, the search for a good  is also called amortized inference.

All in all, we have found a problem of variational Bayesian inference.

Deriving the ELBO 
A basic result in variational inference is that minimizing the Kullback–Leibler divergence (KL-divergence) is equivalent to maximizing the log-likelihood:where  is the entropy of the true distribution. So if we can maximize , we can minimize , and consequently find an accurate approximation .

To maximize , we simply sample many , then use

In order to maximize , it's necessary to find :This usually has no closed form and must be estimated. The usual way to estimate integrals is Monte Carlo integration with importance sampling:where  is a sampling distribution over  that we use to perform the Monte Carlo integration.

But we return to the simplest case with :The tightness of the inequality has a closed form:We have thus obtained the ELBO function:

Maximizing the ELBO 
For fixed , the optimization  simultaneously attempts to maximize  and minimize .

Sincewe haveand soIn other words, maximizing the ELBO would simultaneously allow us to obtain an accurate generative model  and an accurate discriminative model .

Main forms 
That is, the approximate posterior  balances between being a uniform distribution and moving towards the maximum a posteriori .

Data-processing inequality 

Fitting  to  can be done, as usual, by maximizing the loglikelihood :Now, by the ELBO inequality, we can bound , and thusThe right-hand-side simplifies to a KL-divergence, and so we get:This result can be interpreted as a special case of the data processing inequality.

In this interpretation, maximizing  is minimizing , which upper-bounds the real quantity of interest  via the data-processing inequality. That is, we append a latent space to the observable space, paying the price of a weaker inequality for the sake of more computationally efficient minimization of the KL-divergence.

References

Notes 

Theory of probability distributions